Carlow–Kildare was a parliamentary constituency represented in Dáil Éireann, the lower house of the Irish parliament or Oireachtas from 1937 to 1948. The constituency elected 4 deputies (Teachtaí Dála, commonly known as TDs) to the Dáil, on the system of proportional representation by means of the single transferable vote (PR-STV).

History 
The constituency was created for the 1937 general election under the Electoral (Revision of Constituencies) Act 1935, replacing the old Carlow–Kilkenny and Kildare constituencies.

Under the Electoral (Amendment) Act 1947, the constituency was abolished, and the Carlow–Kilkenny and Kildare constituencies were re-created for the 1948 general election.

Boundaries 
The constituency covered all of County Kildare, and most of County Carlow. Carlow–Kildare's boundaries were defined by the 1935 Act as:
"The administrative County of Kildare.
The administrative County of Carlow except the portion thereof which is comprised in the County Constituencies of Wicklow and Wexford."

The Act defines the parts of Carlow in the Wicklow constituency as:
"The district electoral divisions of:
Clonmore, Hacketstown, Haroldstown, Kineagh, Rahill, Rathvilly, Tiknock and Williamstown in the administrative County of Carlow."

The parts of Carlow in the Wexford constituency are defined as:
"The district electoral divisions of:
Ballyellin, Ballymurphy, Borris, Coonogue, Corries, Glynn, Killedmond, Kyle, Marley, Rathanna, Sliguff and Tinnahinch in the administrative County of Carlow."

TDs

Elections

1944 general election

1943 general election

1938 general election

1937 general election

See also 
Dáil constituencies
Politics of the Republic of Ireland
Historic Dáil constituencies
Elections in the Republic of Ireland

References

External links
Oireachtas Members Database

Historic constituencies in County Carlow
Historic constituencies in County Kildare
Dáil constituencies in the Republic of Ireland (historic)
1937 establishments in Ireland
1948 disestablishments in Ireland
Constituencies established in 1937
Constituencies disestablished in 1948